Aliabad-e Davarabad (also Romanized as ‘Alīābād-e Dāvarābād; also known as ‘Alīābād and ‘Alīābād Sarkār) is a village in Baqeran Rural District, in the Central District of Birjand County, South Khorasan Province, Iran. At the 2006 census, its population was 199, in 53 families.

References 

Populated places in Birjand County